is a Buddhist temple in Kyoto.

Buddhist temples in Kyoto